Suriname first participated at the Olympic Games in 1960, and has sent athletes to compete in most Summer Olympic Games since then. The nation missed the 1964 Games, and also participated in the American-led boycott of the 1980 Summer Olympics. Suriname has never participated in the Winter Olympic Games. Surinamese athletes have won two medals at the summer Olympic games.

The National Olympic Committee for Suriname was created in 1959 and recognized by the International Olympic Committee that same year.

Medal tables

Medals by Summer Games

Medals by sport

List of medalists

See also
 List of flag bearers for Suriname at the Olympics
 :Category:Olympic competitors for Suriname
 Suriname at the Paralympics

External links
 
 
 

 
Olympics